Gorytvesica is a genus of moths belonging to the family Tortricidae.

Species
Gorytvesica cerussolinea (Razowski & Wojtusiak, 2006)
Gorytvesica chara (Razowski & Wojtusiak, 2006)
Gorytvesica cidnozodion Razowski & Wojtusiak, 2006
Gorytvesica cosangana Razowski & Pelz, 2005
Gorytvesica decumana Razowski, 1997
Gorytvesica derelicta Razowski & Becker, 2002
Gorytvesica ebenoptera Razowski & Pelz, 2005
Gorytvesica fustigera Razowski & Pelz, 2005
Gorytvesica gorytodes Razowski, 1997
Gorytvesica homaema Razowski & Pelz, 2005
Gorytvesica homora Razowski & Pelz, 2005
Gorytvesica medeter Razowski & Pelz, 2005
Gorytvesica paraleipa Razowski & Pelz, 2005
Gorytvesica sachatamiae Razowski & Pelz, 2005
Gorytvesica sychnopina Razowski & Pelz, 2005
Gorytvesica tenera Razowski & Pelz, 2005

See also
List of Tortricidae genera

References

 , 2005, World Catalogue of Insects 5
 , 1997: Peru, Dept. Hunaco, 25 km NE Hunaco, Cordillero Carpish Pattytrail. Acta zool. cracov. 40: 92.
 , 2005: New species of Gorytvesica Razowski, 1997 and Transtillaspis Razowski, 1987 (Lepidoptera: Tortricidae: Euliini) from Ecuador. Acta Zoologica Cracoviensia 48B (1-2): 57–94. Full article:

External links
tortricidae.com

Euliini
Tortricidae genera